Convoy PQ 4 was the fifth of the Arctic Convoys of World War II by which the Western Allies supplied material aid to the Soviet Union in its fight with Nazi Germany. The Convoy sailed from Hvalfjord, Iceland on 17 November 1941 and arrived at Archangelsk on 28 November 1941.

Ships
The convoy consisted of eight merchant ships (four British and four Soviet) all of which arrived safely. The escort consisted of the cruiser HMS Berwick, the destroyers HMS Offa and HMS Onslow, two minesweepers and two armed trawlers.

Complete List of Ships
The following information is from the Arnold Hague Convoy Database.

References

 Richard Woodman, Arctic Convoys 1941–1945, 1994, 
 Convoy web

PQ 04